In 1832, shortly after the creation of the Kingdom of Belgium, the United States established diplomatic relations.  Since that time, a long line of distinguished envoys have represented American interests in Belgium. These diplomats included men and women whose career paths would lead them to become Secretary of States (Hugh S. Legaré), Secretary of Commerce (Charles Sawyer) and Chair of the Federal Trade Commission (Joseph E. Davies).

Belgian-American Relations were cemented when Brand Whitlock, as representative of the neutral United States, worked during World War I to bring humanitarian aid to help millions of Belgians in danger of starvation caused by the British blockade and the German occupation.

Future envoys found themselves working through  the Marshall Plan, the foundation of the North Atlantic Treaty Organization and joint efforts with the European Union. In 1944, when Franklin D. Roosevelt appointed Charles W. Sawyer to Ambassador to Belgium he remarked "What could be more interesting, than the carrefour [crossroads] of Europe in the closing days of the war?" and during the late 1960s another well-respected envoy John S.D. Eisenhower, the son of President Dwight D. Eisenhower, served as ambassador to Belgium. 

This is a complete list of United States ambassadors to Belgium:

United States Chargés d'Affaires to Belgium 
 Hugh S. Legaré 1832–1836
 Virgil Maxcy 1837–1842
 Henry Washington Hilliard 1842–1844
 Thomas Green Clemson 1844–1851
 Richard H. Bayard 1851–1853
 John Jacob Seibels 1852–1854

United States Ministers Resident to Belgium 
 John Jacob Seibels 1854–1856
 Elisha Y. Fair 1858–1861
 Henry Shelton Sanford 1861–1869
 Joseph Russell Jones 1869–1875
 Ayres Phillips Merrill 1876–1877
 William C. Goodloe 1878–1880
 James O. Putnam 1880–1882
 Nicholas Fish II 1882–1885
 Lambert Tree 1885–1888

United States Envoys Extraordinary and Ministers Plenipotentiary to Belgium 
 Lambert Tree 1888
 John Gibson Parkhurst 1888–1889
 Edwin H. Terrell 1889–1893
 James Stevenson Ewing 1893–1897
 Bellamy Storer 1897–1899
 Lawrence Townsend 1899–1905
 Henry Lane Wilson 1905–1909
 Charles Page Bryan 1910–1911
 Larz Anderson 1911–1912
 Theodore Marburg 1912–1914
 Brand Whitlock 1914–1919

United States Ambassadors to Belgium 
 Brand Whitlock 1919–1921
 Henry P. Fletcher 1922–1924
 William Phillips 1924–1927
 Hugh S. Gibson 1927–1933
 Dave Hennen Morris 1933–1937
 Hugh S. Gibson 1937–1938
 Joseph E. Davies 1938–1939
 John Cudahy 1940
 Anthony Joseph Drexel Biddle, Jr. 1941–1943
 Charles W. Sawyer 1944–1945
 Alan Goodrich Kirk 1946–1949
 Robert Daniel Murphy 1949–1952
 Myron Melvin Cowen 1952–1953
 Frederick M. Alger, Jr. 1953–1957
 John Clifford Folger 1957–1959
 William A. M. Burden 1959–1961
 Douglas MacArthur II 1961–1965
 Ridgway B. Knight 1965–1969
 John S. D. Eisenhower 1969–1971
 Robert Strausz-Hupé 1972–1974
 Leonard Firestone 1974–1977
 Anne Cox Chambers 1977–1981
 Charles H. Price II 1981–1983
 Geoffrey Swaebe 1983–1988
 Maynard W. Glitman 1988–1991
 Bruce Gelb 1991–1993
 Alan Blinken 1993–1997
 Paul L. Cejas 1997–2001
 Stephen Brauer 2001–2003
 Tom C. Korologos 2004–2007
 Sam Fox 2007–2009
 Wayne Bush 2009 (Acting)
 Howard W. Gutman 2009–2013
 Denise Campbell Bauer 2013–2017
 Ronald Gidwitz 2018–2021
 Nicholas Berliner 2021–2022 (Acting)
 Michael M. Adler 2022–present

See also
Belgium – United States relations
Foreign relations of Belgium
Ambassadors of the United States
List of Belgian ambassadors to the United States
United States Ambassador to the European Union - also based in Brussels

References

United States Department of State: Background notes on Belgium

External links
 United States Department of State: Chiefs of Mission for Belgium
 United States Department of State: Belgium
 United States Embassy in Brussels

Belgium

United States